Anatoly Kozlov (born 1955) is a retired Russian heavyweight weightlifter.

Career 
In 1977, he won the Soviet, European and world titles and set three ratified world records, all in the total.

Personal life 
His son, Vasily, also became a competitive weightlifter.

References

1955 births
Living people
Soviet male weightlifters
World Weightlifting Championships medalists
Place of birth missing (living people)